Yorkville is an unincorporated area in Paulding County, Georgia, United States, located near the crossroads of Hwy 113 and Gold Mine Road (FIPS: 93462).

Geography 
Yorkville is located at the coordinates 33.924°N 84.995°W with an elevation of 1362/415ft. According to the United States Census Bureau, the city has a total of 95.86 square miles: 95.494 being land and 0.371 being water. In comparison, Paulding County has a land mass of 313.43 square miles. This means Yorkville is 1/3 of Paulding's land mass.

Demographics 
As of 2018, the United States Census Bureau ACS 5-year Estimates listed a total population of 18,158, 6,186 households, and 4,450 families. The total housing units total 6,544 with 4,477 owned and 1,709 rented. The racial makeup included 76.7% white, 17.1% African American, 3.4% two or more races, 1.2% Asian, and 1.6% from other races. Hispanic or Latino of any race was 7%.  

Looking at the population aged 25 and above, there are 11,032 people. 10,047 (91.07%) obtained a high school/general education diploma or higher, while 985 (8.93%) do not hold a diploma or its equivalent.

References

Populated places in Paulding County, Georgia